GARP may refer to:

Acronyms
 Generalised Axiom of Revealed Preference
 Generic Attribute Registration Protocol, a communications protocol
 Genetic Algorithm for Rule Set Production, to determine ecological niches
 Global Atmospheric Research Programme, 1967-1982
 Global Association of Risk Professionals, a globally recognized membership association for risk managers.
 Gratuitous Address Resolution Protocol announcement
 GARP Study (Genetics, osteoARthritis and Progression Study), an observational study

Other uses
 Monkey D. Garp, a character in the Japanese anime One Piece
 The World According to Garp, a 1978 novel by John Irving
 The World According to Garp (film), a 1982 film based on Irving's novel
 Torkild Garp (1883–1976), Danish gymnast